Marie Luise or Marie-Luise may refer to:

 Marie Luise Kaschnitz (1901-1974), German short story writer, novelist, essayist and poet
 Marie Luise von Degenfeld (1634-1677), Countess
 Marie-Luise Gothein (1863-1931), Prussian scholar, gardener and author
 Marie-Luise Marjan (born 1940), German actress

See also

 Maria Louisa
 Maria Louise
 Maria Luisa
 Maria Luise
 Marie Louise (disambiguation)